Woodstock Road was a short-lived railway station in London on the Hammersmith & Chiswick branch line from South Acton to Hammersmith & Chiswick. The station was opened by the North & South Western Junction Railway in 1909 as an attempt to gain passenger numbers since the opening of the District Line.

References

Disused railway stations in the London Borough of Hounslow
Railway stations in Great Britain opened in 1909
Railway stations in Great Britain closed in 1917
Former North and South Western Junction Railway stations
Buildings and structures in Chiswick